B.P. Koirala Memorial Cancer Hospital (or BPKMCH) is a tertiary cancer hospital located outside the Kathmandu valley in Bharatpur, Chitwan District, Nepal.

The hospital is named in honor of Bishweshwar Prasad Koirala, the first democratically elected Prime Minister of Nepal who died of throat cancer in 1982.

In 1995, it began offering day services and in 1999 began treating inpatients. The hospital was funded equally by China and Nepal, with China sending doctors and other personnel to help train staff for the new facility.

References

External links
 

Hospitals in Nepal
Hospitals established in 1992
1994 establishments in Nepal